Basement Apes is the fourth album released by the Norwegian band Gluecifer.

The title is a pun on The Basement Tapes, a 1975 album by Bob Dylan and The Band.

Track listing 
"Reversed"
"Brutus"
"Losing End"
"Easy Living"
"Little Man"
"Not Enough for You"
"Round and Round"
"Black Book Lodge"
"It Won't Be"
"Shotgun Seat"
"Powertools and Piss"
"I Saw the Stones Move"

2002 albums
Gluecifer albums